Minuscule 338 (in the Gregory-Aland numbering), ε 1006 (Soden), is a Greek minuscule manuscript of the New Testament, on parchment. Palaeographically it has been assigned to the 10th century. The manuscript has complex contents. 
It has marginalia.

Description 

The codex contains a complete text of the four Gospels on 365 parchment leaves. It is written in one column per page, in 18 lines per page.

There is also a division according to the smaller Ammonian Sections (in Mark 233 Sections, the last in 16:8), with references to the Eusebian Canons (written below Ammonian Section numbers).

Text 

Kurt Aland did not place the Greek text of the codex in any Category.
It was not examined by the Claremont Profile Method.

The texts of John 5:4 and John 7:53-8:11 are marked by an obelus.

History 

The manuscript was examined by Pasino, Scholz, and Burgon. It was added to the list of New Testament manuscripts by Scholz (1794-1852). 
C. R. Gregory saw it in 1886.

The manuscript is currently housed at the Turin National University Library (B. VII. 33) in Turin. Three folios of the codex are housed in the same library but on the shelf number B. VI. 43.

See also 

 List of New Testament minuscules
 Biblical manuscript
 Textual criticism

References

Further reading 

 Giuseppe Passino, Codices Manuscripti Bibliohecae Regii Taurinensis Athenaei, Turin 1742, vol. 2.
 W. Reader, Entdeckung von Fregmentem aus zwei zerstörten Minuskeln (338 und 612), Biblica 61, (1980), pp. 407–411.

Greek New Testament minuscules
10th-century biblical manuscripts